The Women's Super League (WSL) is the highest league of women's football in England. The league, which started in 2011, was divided in two separate divisions (WSL 1 and WSL 2) from 2014 with the latter rebranded as the FA Women's Championship following a restructure in 2019; only the WSL 1 is considered in this list. The following players must meet both of the following two criteria:
Have played at least one WSL game. Players who were signed by WSL clubs, but only played in lower leagues, cup games and/or European games, or did not play in any competitive games at all, are not included.
Are considered foreign, i.e., outside United Kingdom determined by the following:
''A player is considered foreign if they are not eligible to play for the national teams of England, Scotland, Wales or Northern Ireland.
More specifically:
If a player has been capped on international level, the national team is used; if they have been capped by more than one country, the highest level (or the most recent) team is used. These include British players with dual citizenship.
If a player has not been capped on international level, their country of birth is used, except those who were born abroad from British parents or moved to the United Kingdom at a young age, and those who clearly indicated to have switched their nationality to another nation.

Clubs listed are those for which the player has played at least one WSL game.

In bold: players who are currently under contract by a WSL club.

40 different nations have been represented in the WSL by 326 players. The Republic of Ireland is the most represented nation with 35 players. Cameroon was the most recent nation to be newly-represented when Easther Mayi Kith made their WSL debut playing for Reading on 5 March 2023 against West Ham United.

Australia 
Laura Alleway – Lincoln – 2012
Mackenzie Arnold – West Ham United – 2020– 
Danielle Brogan – Notts County – 2014
Steph Catley – Arsenal – 2020– 
Isobel Dalton – Bristol Academy – 2015
Emily van Egmond – West Ham United – 2020–21
Caitlin Foord – Arsenal – 2020– 
Mary Fowler – Manchester City – 2022– 
Caitlin Friend – Notts County – 2014
Jacynta Galabadaarachchi – West Ham United – 2019–20
Emily Gielnik – Liverpool, Aston Villa – 2012, 2021– 
Alexandra Gummer – Doncaster Rovers Belles – 2016
Alanna Kennedy – Tottenham Hotspur, Manchester City – 2020– 
Sam Kerr – Chelsea – 2020– 
Chloe Logarzo – Bristol City – 2020–21
Aivi Luik – Notts County – 2016
Ella Mastrantonio – Bristol City – 2020–21
Collette McCallum – Lincoln – 2012
Courtney Nevin – Leicester City – 2023– 
Tanya Oxtoby – Doncaster Rovers Belles – 2012
Hayley Raso – Everton, Manchester City – 2020– 
Remy Siemsen – Leicester City – 2023– 
Kyah Simon – Tottenham Hotspur – 2021– 
Clare Wheeler – Everton – 2022– 
Lydia Williams – Arsenal, Brighton & Hove Albion – 2020–22, 2023– 
Tameka Yallop – West Ham United – 2021–22

Austria 
Simona Koren – Sunderland – 2017–18
Viktoria Schnaderbeck – Arsenal, Tottenham Hotspur – 2018–22
Laura Wienroither – Arsenal – 2022– 
Manuela Zinsberger – Arsenal – 2019–

Belgium 
Julie Biesmans – Bristol City – 2017–19
Yana Daniëls – Bristol City, Liverpool – 2017–21, 2022– 
Lorca van de Putte – Bristol City – 2017–18
Justine Vanhaevermaet – Reading – 2021– 
Tessa Wullaert – Manchester City – 2018–20

Brazil 
Ester – Chelsea – 2013
Ivana Fuso – Manchester United – 2020– 
Giovana Queiroz – Everton, Arsenal – 2022– 
Rafaelle Souza – Arsenal – 2022–

Bulgaria 
Evdokiya Popadinova – Bristol Academy – 2015

Cameroon 
Easther Mayi Kith – Reading – 2023–

Canada 
Janine Beckie – Manchester City – 2018–22
Kadeisha Buchanan – Chelsea – 2022– 
Jessie Fleming – Chelsea – 2020– 
Maddie Hill – Sunderland – 2016
Alyssa Lagonia – Doncaster Rovers Belles – 2012
Adriana Leon – West Ham United, Manchester United – 2019– 
Deanne Rose – Reading – 2021– 
Desiree Scott – Notts County – 2014–15 
Kylla Sjoman – Doncaster Rovers Belles, Sunderland – 2011, 2016–18
Shelina Zadorsky – Tottenham Hotspur – 2020–

Chile 
Christiane Endler – Chelsea – 2014

China PR 
Tang Jiali – Tottenham Hotspur – 2021–22

Czech Republic 
Kateřina Svitková – West Ham United, Chelsea – 2020–

Denmark 
Janni Arnth – Arsenal – 2019
Simone Boye Sørensen – Arsenal – 2021–22
Signe Bruun – Manchester United – 2022
Nina Frausing Pedersen – Liverpool – 2014
Pernille Harder – Chelsea – 2020– 
Karen Holmgaard – Everton – 2022– 
Sara Holmgaard – Everton – 2023– 
Mie Leth Jans – Manchester City – 2017–18
Stine Larsen – Aston Villa – 2020–21
Sofie Lundgaard – Liverpool – 2023– 
Matilde Lundorf – Brighton & Hove Albion – 2019–20
Kathrine Møller Kühl – Arsenal – 2023– 
Nadia Nadim – Manchester City – 2018
Cecilie Sandvej – Birmingham City – 2021–22
Rikke Sevecke – Everton – 2020– 
Emma Snerle – West Ham United – 2022– 
Nicoline Sørensen – Everton – 2020– 
Amalie Thestrup – West Ham United – 2023– 
Sanne Troelsgaard – Reading – 2022– 
Katrine Veje – Arsenal, Everton – 2019–20, 2022–

Dominican Republic 
Lucia Leon – Tottenham Hotspur – 2019–21

Equatorial Guinea 
Jade Boho – Bristol Academy, Reading – 2015–16

Finland 
Adelina Engman – Chelsea – 2018–20
Nora Heroum – Brighton & Hove Albion – 2020–21
Juliette Kemppi – Bristol City – 2018–19
Emma Koivisto – Brighton & Hove Albion, Liverpool – 2021– 
Tinja-Riikka Korpela – Everton, Tottenham Hotspur – 2019– 
Eveliina Summanen – Tottenham Hotspur – 2022–

France 
Viviane Asseyi – West Ham United – 2022– 
Karima Benameur Taieb – Manchester City – 2020–22
Estelle Cascarino – Manchester United – 2023– 
Hawa Cissoko – West Ham United – 2020– 
Maéva Clémaron – Everton, Tottenham Hotspur – 2019–22
Daphne Corboz – Manchester City – 2015–16
Kenza Dali – West Ham United, Everton, Aston Villa – 2019– 
Valérie Gauvin – Everton – 2020–22
Anissa Lahmari – Reading – 2017
Léa Le Garrec – Brighton & Hove Albion – 2019–20
Ève Périsset – Chelsea – 2022– 
Pauline Peyraud-Magnin – Arsenal – 2018–20
Aïssatou Tounkara – Manchester United – 2022–

Germany 
Katharina Baunach – West Ham United – 2019–20
Ann-Katrin Berger – Birmingham City, Chelsea – 2016– 
Pauline Bremer – Manchester City – 2017–20
Marisa Ewers – Birmingham City, Aston Villa – 2016–19, 2020–22
Josephine Henning – Arsenal – 2016, 2017–18
Tabea Kemme – Arsenal – 2018–20 
Turid Knaak – Arsenal – 2014
Janina Leitzig – Leicester City – 2023– 
Melanie Leupolz – Chelsea – 2020– 
Isabelle Linden – Birmingham City – 2016–18
Leonie Maier – Arsenal, Everton – 2019– 
Ramona Petzelberger – Aston Villa, Tottenham Hotspur – 2020– 
Anke Preuß – Sunderland, Liverpool – 2017–20
Kathleen Radtke – Manchester City – 2014–15
Nicole Rolser – Liverpool – 2013–15
Corina Schröder – Liverpool, Birmingham City – 2013–16
Caroline Siems – Aston Villa – 2020–21
Julia Simic – West Ham United – 2018–20
Laura Vetterlein – West Ham United – 2019–21
Lisa Weiß – Aston Villa – 2020–21

Greece 
Veatriki Sarri – Birmingham City, Brighton & Hove Albion – 2021–

Iceland 
Dagný Brynjarsdóttir – West Ham United – 2021– 
Edda Garðarsdóttir – Chelsea – 2013
Rakel Hönnudóttir – Reading – 2019
Katrín Ómarsdóttir – Liverpool, Doncaster Rovers Belles – 2013–16
Ólína Guðbjörg Viðarsdóttir – Chelsea – 2013

Italy 
Aurora Galli – Everton – 2021–

Jamaica 
Jade Bailey – Arsenal, Chelsea, Reading, Liverpool – 2013–20
Paige Bailey-Gayle – Arsenal, Leicester City – 2018–19, 2021–22
Shania Hayles – Birmingham City, Aston Villa – 2018–19, 2020–22
Satara Murray – Liverpool – 2016–19
Atlanta Primus – Chelsea – 2014–15
Vyan Sampson – Arsenal, West Ham United – 2014–18, 2018–20
Khadija Shaw – Manchester City – 2021– 
Drew Spence – Chelsea, Tottenham Hotspur – 2011– 
Rebecca Spencer – Birmingham City, Chelsea, West Ham United, Tottenham Hotspur – 2012– 
Victoria Williams – Doncaster Rovers Belles, Chelsea, Sunderland, Brighton & Hove Albion – 2011–

Japan 
Yui Hasegawa – West Ham United, Manchester City – 2021– 
Honoka Hayashi – West Ham United – 2022– 
Mana Iwabuchi – Aston Villa, Arsenal, Tottenham Hotspur – 2021– 
Yukari Kinga – Arsenal – 2014
Shinobu Ohno – Arsenal – 2014
Fuka Nagano – Liverpool – 2023– 
Yūki Nagasato – Chelsea – 2013–14
Risa Shimizu – West Ham United – 2022–

Kosovo 
Elizabeta Ejupi – Notts County – 2016

Malta 
Emma Lipman – Manchester City – 2014–15

Morocco 
Rosella Ayane – Chelsea, Bristol City, Tottenham Hotspur – 2013–16, 2018–

Netherlands 
Mandy van den Berg – Liverpool, Reading – 2016–18
Dominique Bruinenberg – Sunderland, Everton – 2017–19
Marije Brummel – Bristol Academy – 2015
Kerstin Casparij – Manchester City – 2022– 
Daniëlle van de Donk – Arsenal – 2016–21
Damaris Egurrola – Everton – 2020–21
Kika van Es – Everton – 2019–20
Esmee de Graaf – West Ham United, Leicester City – 2018–20, 2021–22
Jackie Groenen – Chelsea, Manchester United – 2014–15, 2019–22
Nadine Hanssen – Aston Villa – 2020–21
Anouk Hoogendijk – Bristol Academy, Arsenal – 2011, 2014
Dominique Janssen – Arsenal – 2015–19
Inessa Kaagman – Everton, Brighton & Hove Albion – 2018–22
Danique Kerkdijk – Bristol City, Brighton & Hove Albion – 2017–22
Vita van der Linden – Bristol City – 2019–20
Tessel Middag – Manchester City, West Ham United – 2016–20
Vivianne Miedema – Arsenal – 2017– 
Marthe Munsterman – Everton – 2017–18
Aniek Nouwen – Chelsea – 2021– 
Victoria Pelova – Arsenal – 2023– 
Lucienne Reichardt – West Ham United – 2018–19
Jill Roord – Arsenal – 2019–21
Shanice van de Sanden – Liverpool – 2016–17, 2022–
Katja Snoeijs – Everton – 2022– 
Sari van Veenendaal – Arsenal – 2015–19
Siri Worm – Everton, Tottenham Hotspur – 2017–21

New Zealand 
CJ Bott – Leicester City – 2022– 
Hayley Bowden (née Moorwood) – Chelsea, Lincoln – 2011, 2013
Aroon Clansey – Liverpool – 2012
Olivia Chance – Everton, Bristol City – 2017–20
Katie Duncan (née Hoyle) – Notts County – 2014
Anna Green – Notts County, Reading – 2014, 2017–18
Sarah Gregorius – Liverpool – 2013
Betsy Hassett – Manchester City – 2014 
Emma Kete – Lincoln, Manchester City – 2011, 2014
Anna Leat – West Ham United, Aston Villa – 2022– 
Ria Percival – West Ham United, Tottenham Hotspur – 2018– 
Ali Riley – Chelsea – 2018–19
Katie Rood – Lincoln, Bristol City – 2012, 2018–19
Rebekah Stott – Brighton & Hove Albion – 2020–21, 2023– 
Rosie White – Liverpool – 2015–16

Nigeria 
Asisat Oshoala – Liverpool, Arsenal – 2015–16
Ashleigh Plumptre – Notts County, Leicester City – 2014–15, 2021– 
Ini-Abasi Umotong – Brighton & Hove Albion – 2018–20

Norway 
Guro Bergsvand – Brighton & Hove Albion – 2023– 
Celin Bizet Ildhusøy – Tottenham Hotspur – 2022– 
Kristine Bjørdal Leine – Reading – 2019–21
Julie Blakstad – Manchester City – 2022– 
Vilde Bøe Risa – Manchester United – 2021– 
Amalie Eikeland – Reading – 2019– 
Cecilie Fiskerstrand – Brighton & Hove Albion – 2020–21
Benedicte Håland – Bristol City – 2021
Andrine Hegerberg – Birmingham City – 2016–18
Hilde Gunn Olsen – Sunderland – 2015–17
Cecilie Kvamme – West Ham United – 2019–21
Thea Kyvåg – West Ham United – 2022–23
Frida Maanum – Arsenal – 2021– 
Aurora Mikalsen – Tottenham Hotspur – 2021
Maren Mjelde – Chelsea – 2017– 
Ingrid Moe Wold – Everton – 2020–21
Guro Reiten – Chelsea – 2019– 
Ingrid Ryland – Liverpool – 2015
Line Smørsgård – Liverpool – 2015
Elise Stenevik – Everton – 2022– 
Elisabeth Terland – Brighton & Hove Albion – 2022– 
Maria Thorisdottir – Chelsea, Manchester United – 2017– 
Lisa-Marie Karlseng Utland – Reading – 2019–20

Poland 
Nikola Karczewska – Tottenham Hotspur – 2022– 
Wiktoria Kiszkis – West Ham United – 2019–

Portugal 
Ana Borges – Chelsea – 2014–16
Amanda DaCosta – Liverpool – 2013–14
Matilde Fidalgo – Manchester City – 2019–20
Tatiana Pinto – Bristol Academy – 2015
Diana Silva – Aston Villa – 2020–21

Republic of Ireland 
Isibeal Atkinson – West Ham United – 2022– 
Courtney Brosnan – West Ham United, Everton – 2019– 
Emma Byrne – Arsenal – 2011–16
Diane Caldwell – Manchester United, Reading – 2022– 
Megan Campbell – Manchester City, Liverpool – 2016–21, 2022– 
Megan Connolly – Brighton & Hove Albion – 2019– 
Stef Curtis – Birmingham City – 2011
Niamh Fahey – Arsenal, Chelsea, Liverpool – 2011–17, 2018–20, 2022– 
Lillie Fenlon-Billson – Bristol Academy, Doncaster Rovers Belles, Liverpool, Lincoln – 2011–13
Jamie Finn – Birmingham City – 2021–22
Ciara Grant – Arsenal – 2011–13
Marie Hourihan – Birmingham City, Chelsea, Manchester City, Brighton & Hove Albion – 2011–19, 2021–22
Rianna Jarrett – Brighton & Hove Albion – 2020–21
Leanne Kiernan – West Ham United, Liverpool – 2018–21, 2022– 
Harriet Lambe – Yeovil Town – 2017–18
Ruesha Littlejohn – Liverpool, West Ham United, Birmingham City, Aston Villa – 2011–12, 2019– 
Aoife Mannion – Birmingham City, Manchester City, Manchester United – 2013– 
Grace Moloney – Reading – 2016– 
Katie McCabe – Arsenal – 2016– 
Áine O'Gorman – Doncaster Rovers Belles – 2011–12
Denise O'Sullivan – Brighton & Hove Albion – 2020
Fiona O'Sullivan – Notts County – 2014–15
Heather Payne – Bristol City – 2018–19
Sophie Perry – Chelsea, Reading, Brighton & Hove Albion – 2011–12, 2016, 2018
Louise Quinn – Arsenal, Birmingham City – 2017–20, 2021–22
Lucy Quinn – Birmingham City, Tottenham Hotspur – 2017–22
Lois Roche – Reading – 2016
Stephanie Roche – Sunderland – 2015–17
Julie-Ann Russell – Doncaster Rovers Belles – 2012
Eleanor Ryan-Doyle – Birmingham City – 2021–22
Harriet Scott – Reading, Birmingham City – 2011–22
Tyler Toland – Manchester City – 2019–21
Yvonne Tracy – Arsenal – 2011–13
Megan Walsh – Everton, Notts County, Yeovil Town, Brighton & Hove Albion – 2013–14, 2016– 
Emily Whelan – Birmingham City – 2021–22
Jessica Ziu – West Ham United – 2022–

Russia 
Alsu Abdullina – Chelsea – 2022–

Samoa 
Monique Fischer – Yeovil Town – 2018–19

Serbia 
Jelena Čanković – Chelsea – 2022– 
Dejana Stefanović – Brighton & Hove Albion – 2023–

South Korea 
Cho So-hyun – West Ham United, Tottenham Hotspur – 2019– 
Jeon Ga-eul – Bristol City, Reading – 2019–21
Ji So-yun – Chelsea – 2014–22
Lee Geum-min – Manchester City, Brighton & Hove Albion  – 2019– 
Park Ye-eun – Brighton & Hove Albion – 2022–

Spain 
Laia Aleixandri – Manchester City – 2022– 
Ona Batlle – Manchester United – 2020– 
Marta Corredera – Arsenal – 2015–16
Lucía García – Manchester United – 2022– 
Keka – Bristol Academy – 2013–14
Vicky Losada – Arsenal, Manchester City – 2015–16, 2021–2023
Adriana Martín – Chelsea – 2012
Leila Ouahabi – Manchester City – 2022– 
Natalia Pablos – Bristol Academy, Arsenal – 2013–16
Laura del Río – Bristol Academy – 2012–14 
Cristina Torkildsen – Birmingham City – 2011–15

Sweden 
Jonna Andersson – Chelsea – 2018–22
Filippa Angeldal – Manchester City – 2021– 
Anna Anvegård – Everton – 2021–22
Kosovare Asllani – Manchester City – 2016–17
Marija Banušić – Chelsea – 2015
Hanna Bennison – Everton – 2021– 
Nathalie Björn – Everton – 2021– 
Stina Blackstenius – Arsenal – 2022– 
Magdalena Eriksson – Chelsea – 2017– 
Lina Hurtig – Arsenal – 2022– 
Sofia Jakobsson – Chelsea – 2013
Johanna Rytting Kaneryd – Chelsea – 2022– 
Maria Karlsson – Doncaster Rovers Belles – 2011
Maja Krantz – Notts County – 2016
Emma Kullberg – Brighton & Hove Albion – 2022– 
Hedvig Lindahl – Chelsea – 2015–19
Emma Lundh – Liverpool – 2016
Zećira Mušović – Chelsea – 2021– 
Nor Mustafa – West Ham United – 2020–21
Amanda Nildén – Brighton & Hove Albion – 2018–20
Lotta Ökvist – Manchester United – 2019–21
Jessica Samuelsson – Arsenal – 2017–19
Louise Schillgard (née Fors) – Liverpool – 2013
Julia Spetsmark – Manchester City – 2018
Filippa Wallén – West Ham United – 2020
Emma Wilhelmsson – Chelsea – 2014
Julia Zigiotti Olme – Brighton & Hove Albion – 2022–

Switzerland 
Ramona Bachmann – Chelsea – 2017–20
Malin Gut – Arsenal – 2020–22
Alisha Lehmann – West Ham United, Everton, Aston Villa – 2018– 
Noelle Maritz – Arsenal – 2020– 
Lia Wälti – Arsenal – 2018–

United States 
Abby Dahlkemper – Manchester City – 2021
Crystal Dunn – Chelsea – 2017–18
Whitney Engen – Liverpool – 2013
Lucy Gillett – Brighton & Hove Albion – 2017–19
Tobin Heath – Manchester United, Arsenal – 2020–22
Brooke Hendrix – West Ham United – 2018–19
Adrienne Jordan – Birmingham City – 2019–20
Rose Lavelle – Manchester City – 2020–21
Beverly Leon – Sunderland – 2016 
Carli Lloyd – Manchester City – 2017
Sam Mewis – Manchester City – 2020–21
Alex Morgan – Tottenham Hotspur – 2020
Zoe Morse – Brighton & Hove Albion – 2023– 
Heather O'Reilly – Arsenal – 2017–18
Christen Press – Manchester United – 2020–21
Erin Simon – West Ham United, Leicester City – 2018–20, 2022– 
Katie Stengel – Liverpool – 2022– 
Libby Stout – Liverpool – 2014–15
Brianna Visalli – West Ham United, Birmingham City, Brighton & Hove Albion – 2018–20, 2023– 
Zaneta Wyne – Sunderland, West Ham United – 2017–18, 2021–22

Venezuela 
Deyna Castellanos – Manchester City – 2022–

Notes

References

 
England
England WSL
 
Association football player non-biographical articles